Kerala Sahitya Akademi Award is given each year, since 1958, by the Kerala Sahitya Akademi (Kerala Literary Academy), to Malayalam writers for their outstanding books of literary merit. The awards are given in various categories. The Kerala Sahitya Akademi Fellowship is also awarded to induct Malayalam writers as distinguished members of the Akademi.

Awards
 Kerala Sahitya Akademi Award for Poetry
 Kerala Sahitya Akademi Award for Novel
 Kerala Sahitya Akademi Award for Story
 Kerala Sahitya Akademi Award for Drama
 Kerala Sahitya Akademi Award for Literary Criticism
 Kerala Sahitya Akademi Award for Biography and Autobiography
 Kerala Sahitya Akademi Award for Travelogue
 Kerala Sahitya Akademi Award for Humour
 Kerala Sahitya Akademi Award for Translation
 Kerala Sahitya Akademi Award for Children's Literature
 Kerala Sahitya Akademi Award for Scholarly Literature
 Kerala Sahitya Akademi Award for Overall Contributions
 Kerala Sahitya Akademi Fellowship
 Kerala Sahitya Akademi Award for Miscellaneous Works

Awards by year
 2021 Kerala Sahitya Akademi Awards (Announced in 2022)
 2020 Kerala Sahitya Akademi Awards (Announced in 2021)
 2019 Kerala Sahitya Akademi Awards (Announced in 2021)
 2018 Kerala Sahitya Akademi Awards (Announced in 2019)
 2017 Kerala Sahitya Akademi Awards (Announced in 2019)
 2016 Kerala Sahitya Akademi Awards (Announced in 2018)
 2015 Kerala Sahitya Akademi Awards
 2014 Kerala Sahitya Akademi Awards
 2013 Kerala Sahitya Akademi Awards
 2012 Kerala Sahitya Akademi Awards
 2011 Kerala Sahitya Akademi Awards
 2010 Kerala Sahitya Akademi Awards

See also
 List of Malayalam literary awards
 List of Sahitya Akademi Award winners for Malayalam

References

External links

Awards established in 1958
Malayalam literary awards
 
1958 establishments in Kerala